Wilfred Baugh Allen JP (14 Nov. 1849 - 10 June 1922) was a Welsh judge.

He was the son of George Baugh Allen of Cilrhiw, Pembrokeshire and his wife Dorothea Hannah (née Eaton).  His paternal grandfather was Lancelot Baugh Allen. He was educated at Rugby and Trinity College, Cambridge.  He was admitted at the Inner Temple in 1880 and was called to the bar in 1882.  He served as a member of the South Eastern Circuit.

He was Justice of the Peace for both Pembrokeshire and Nottinghamshire.

In 1883 he married Anne Sophia Wedgwood, daughter of late Rev. Robert Wedgwood of Dumbleton, Gloucestershire, and granddaughter of John Wedgwood.  The Wedgwood and Allen families having been linked for some time, his great aunt Elizabeth Allen having married Josiah Wedgwood II.  They had one son, Richard Lancelot Baugh Allen, who died in Egypt in 1918 on active service during the First World War with the 67th Bgde Royal Field Artillery.

References 

1849 births
1922 deaths
19th-century Welsh judges
People educated at Rugby School
Alumni of Trinity College, Cambridge
Members of the Inner Temple
20th-century Welsh judges